Ispat Post Graduate Institute and Super Specialty Hospital (IPGI&SSH) is a medical college and multi speciality hospital located in sector 19 of the city of Rourkela in India. It is associated with the Rourkela Steel Plant.

History 
Ispat General Hospital under RSP, SAIL, carries a legacy of six decades. With strength of 600 beds and established in the year 1959 to provide quality medical & health services to the employees of RSP, members of their family, supporting population and inhabitants of the neighboring areas of Odisha and its adjoining states.

References

Rourkela
Hospitals in Rourkela
Medical colleges in Odisha
Educational institutions in India with year of establishment missing